Appreciation may refer to:

Financial
 Capital appreciation
 Currency appreciation and depreciation

Other
 Gratitude
 Art criticism

See also
 Depreciation

cs:Apreciace
pt:Reavaliação
fi:Arvonlisäys
sv:Appreciering